Jamie's Quick & Easy Food is a UK food lifestyle programme which has aired on Channel 4 since 2017. In each half-hour episode, host Jamie Oliver creates simple and delicious recipes using just five ingredients.

The show premiered on 21 August 2017. A tie-in book of recipes called 5 Ingredients - Quick & Easy Food, was released on 24 August 2017.

Episodes

Season 1 (2017)

Season 2 (2018)

Season 3 (2019)

Season 4 (2020)

References

External links 
 Jamie's Quick & Easy Food at Channel 4 
 Scrapbook of recipes
 Fresh One Productions

British cooking television shows
Channel 4 original programming